John F. Hawley (August 23, 1958 – December 12, 2021) was an American astrophysicist and a professor of astronomy at the University of Virginia.  In 2013, he shared the Shaw Prize for Astronomy with Steven Balbus.

Early life
John Hawley was born in 1958 in Annapolis, Maryland.  He is the younger brother of former astronaut Steven A. Hawley and graduated from Central High School in Salina, Kansas.

Hawley is a graduate of Haverford College. He received his Ph.D. in astronomy from the University of Illinois at Urbana–Champaign in 1984.

Professional career
Hawley was a Bantrell Prize Fellow in Theoretical Astrophysics at the California Institute of Technology from 1984 to 1987.  He then joined the faculty of the University of Virginia in 1987 as an assistant professor.  He was promoted to full professor in 1999 and was chair of the Department of Astronomy from 2006 to 2012.  As of 2015, Hawley is the Associate Dean for the Sciences in the College of Liberal Arts and Sciences. His research interests include computational astrophysics and accretion disks.

Recognition
Hawley was the 1993 recipient of the Helen B. Warner Prize for Astronomy of the American Astronomical Society.  In 2013, he and former colleague Steven Balbus shared the Shaw Prize in Astronomy for their work on the magnetorotational instability (MRI). Considered one of the highest honors in astronomy, the prize included a US$1 million cash award. According to the Shaw selection committee the "discovery and elucidation of the magnetorotational instability (MRI)" solved the previously "elusive" problem of accretion, a widespread phenomenon in astrophysics and "provides what to this day remains the only viable mechanism for the outward transfer of angular momentum in accretion disks".  The Shaw Prize ceremony was held September 23 in Hong Kong.

When Hawley learned of the Shaw Prize via email, he thought it was a scam.  "I started looking for the Nigerian return address and a request for my bank account number," he later joked.  He also recalled watching late-night kung fu movies made by Run Run Shaw, the prize's founder, and joked that now he would have to buy a good tuxedo rather than wear "the usual astronomer attire – blue jeans and sneakers."  On the prize money, he commented "We're just selfless scientists who live for the joy of discovery, but it's nice to get some cash, too."

References

External links 
University of Virginia Department of Astronomy
The Shaw Prize

1958 births
2021 deaths
American astrophysicists
University of Illinois Urbana-Champaign alumni
California Institute of Technology faculty
University of Virginia faculty
People from Annapolis, Maryland
Deaths from cancer in Virginia